"21 Guns" is a song by American rock band Green Day. It was released as the second single from their eighth studio album, 21st Century Breakdown (2009), and serves as the sixteenth track from the album. The single was released through Reprise Records on May 25, 2009 as a digital download and July 14, 2009 as a CD single.

The song has been a commercial success on the Billboard Hot 100 chart, peaking at No. 22, becoming their highest charting single since "Wake Me Up When September Ends" in 2005. To date, it is also their last top 40 hit in the United States. The song is also featured on the soundtrack of the film Transformers: Revenge of the Fallen and is featured as one of the songs during the end credits.

It was nominated for a Grammy for Best Rock Performance by a Duo or Group with Vocal and Best Rock Song in 2010.

Background and composition 

"21 Guns" addresses the topic of patriotism. Frontman and chief songwriter Billie Joe Armstrong told Q, in May 2009: "It brings up 21st Century Breakdown in a lot of ways, and the 21-gun salute for someone that's fallen, but done in an arena rock 'n' roll sort of way."

According to Q, the song is "a mammoth power ballad with a chorus like Mott the Hoople's All the Young Dudes." William Goodman from Spin agreed, also comparing the song to All The Young Dudes. Entertainment Weeklys Simon Vozick-Levinson described it as a "sensitive arena rock cut that made us think of Toto's 'Africa'. While the chorus sounded more like ELO's 'Telephone Line.' A Rolling Stone article commented that it "has a dash of 'Boulevard of Broken Dreams' to it." Spins Goodman agreed, writing: "This track covers a lot of territory in its five minutes, from a solo acoustic guitar (reminiscent of "Boulevard of Broken Dreams") to Brian May-worthy electric riffage. But the chorus holds the killer hook, [because] Armstrong hits highs with his voice in a thrilling moment."

The song has been labeled by critics as arena rock, pop-punk, and power pop.

Critical reception 
The song has received critical acclaim. Chris Fallon writing for AbsolutePunk commented that "it is arguably the album's highlight, presenting an anti-war ballad that is both monumentally enduring and also sophisticated protest." James Montgomery of MTV News described it as "a cell-phones-in-the-air anthem, starting with more sharply strummed acoustic guitars." Colin Moriarty from IGN wrote that the track is "perhaps the best song on the album as a whole, is a multi-faceted song with a pretty poignant message to boot." Jordan Richardson of Blogcritics commented: "It's the album’s anti-war hymn, reaching heroic heights with a sleek sort of sappiness that fits flawlessly. The range and sentiment may dishearten those looking for a little more Dookie from their Green Day, but I’ve never heard Billie Joe sound so good and so earnest as he pulls his frail voice upwards to knock out some stunning high notes." Mayer Nissim gave the song 3 out of 5 stars, writing: "It combines verses reminiscent of Neil Young's 'Heart of Gold' with big power-pop chord changes and choruses that soar in all the right places. The jerky charm of the band's earlier work may be missing, but there's still lots to enjoy here."

However, Adam Downer from Sputnikmusic gave a negative review, commenting that "it sounds like a terrible rewrite of something John Lennon never released."

Chart performance 
The song debuted at No. 55 on the Billboard Hot 100, peaking at No. 22 (becoming their highest peaking song since the 2005 hit "Wake Me Up When September Ends", and their second-to-last single to debut on the chart, as after 'Oh Love', all of their subsequent tracks have failed to chart), and No. 81 on the Canadian Hot 100, reaching #15. It reached No. 3 on the Alternative Songs chart and No. 17 on the Hot Mainstream Rock Tracks chart. Also, on the [[Pop Songs|Billboard Pop Songs]] it reached #7. On the Australian ARIA Singles Chart, the song peaked at #14. On the UK Singles Chart, it debuted at No. 100 and rose to #36, and as of 2021, remains their last UK Top 40 hit. In New Zealand, the song debuted at No. 23 and peaked at No. 3 in its seventh week on the chart. In New Zealand, it was certified Platinum after 13 weeks on the chart, selling over 15,000 copies. It was certified Platinum by the RIAA. The single was also certified Platinum in Italy. In the UK Singles Chart, the song charted at No.36, and as of 2021, remains their last UK Top 40 hit.

 Release and media appearance 
"21 Guns" was released to modern punk radio stations on May 25, 2009, although it had already been played on some radio stations, such as KROQ in Los Angeles and 101.9 in New York City.  In the radio edit, the song is over forty seconds shorter than the album version due to the bridge being shortened and the intro being taken out. The CD single and clear 7" single were released on July 14, 2009.

The song is featured heavily in Transformers: Revenge of the Fallen and appears on the soundtrack, which was released on June 12, 2009. It became available for download on the music video game series Rock Band on July 7, 2009, along with the songs "East Jesus Nowhere" and "Know Your Enemy.

The song was featured in episode 6 of The Vampire Diaries. The song is featured in the video game Green Day: Rock Band and is downloadable content for the Rock Band series.

A live version was also released on 21 Guns Live EP in September 2009.

 Music video 
A music video was directed by Marc Webb and filmed in Los Angeles on June 6, 2009. It premiered on MySpace on Monday, June 22, 2009 at midnight EDT. A shorter version of the video also exists, which is set to the radio edit of the song. 

It is the third Green Day video to feature touring guitarist Jason White performing with the band, following "Wake Me Up When September Ends" and "Working Class Hero". He is also seen briefly in the music videos for "When I Come Around" and "Jesus of Suburbia" but he is not performing with the band. 

After spending the previous week at number 3, the video peaked at number one on VH1 Top 20 Countdown on August 22, 2009 and again on September 19, 2009. It also won Best Rock Video (Green Day), Best Direction (Marc Webb) and Best Cinematography (Jonathan Sela) for the 2009 MTV Video Music Awards.

The video takes place with the band and the album's two protagonists Christian (Josh Boswell) and Gloria (Lisa Stelly) taking refuge in a white room after robbing a bank. The police arrive outside the room and open fire through the window, to the couple's terror. As bullets rain through the room, the band continues playing. Gloria picks up the phone and throws it into a fish tank. As the bullets continue to fly and tear apart the room, Christian and Gloria become calm and walk toward each other, unharmed by the bullets. They embrace and kiss as the room goes dark, recreating the 21st Century Breakdown cover art. As the song ends, the room lights up again, and they are still uninjured. After the room lights up, there are various shots of destruction in the room, including a shot of some of the writing on the walls. The writing includes an excerpt of the lyrics to "21 Guns", as well as those of the song "See The Light" which is the final song on the album. The video may represent the meaning of the song in the story.

 Musical cast version 

Green Day has recorded two versions of "21 Guns" with the cast of American Idiot''. The recording was produced by Billie Joe Armstrong. The recording with Armstrong singing the male solo parts was released on December 3 to Spinner.com and also released for digital download on December 22. The video was released February 1.

The second version of the song with the cast of American Idiot features Stark Sands, John Gallagher Jr., and Michael Esper singing their respective solos instead of Armstrong.

It was performed with Armstrong singing lead male vocals at the 52nd Grammy Awards.

Live EP 

Green Day released a live EP for the song including live performances of "Welcome to Paradise", "Brain Stew/Jaded" and "F.O.D." recorded live in Albany, New York and Madison Square Garden. This EP was released on the Australian iTunes store, Amazon UK, and Napster.

Track listing 
 Original version:

 Musical cast version:

 Live EP:

Charts and certifications

Weekly charts

Year-end charts

Certifications

Personnel 
 Billie Joe Armstrong – lead vocals, acoustic and electric guitars, piano
 Mike Dirnt – bass guitar, backing vocals
 Tré Cool – drums, percussion

See also
 List of anti-war songs

References 

2000s ballads
2009 singles
Anti-war songs
Green Day songs
Rock ballads
Songs written by Billie Joe Armstrong
Song recordings produced by Butch Vig
Music videos directed by Marc Webb
Songs written by Mike Dirnt
2008 songs
2009 songs
Number-one singles in Poland
Reprise Records singles
MTV Video Music Award for Best Direction
Songs written by Tré Cool